Muhammad Rashad Khan is a Pakistani politician from Shangla District who is currently a member of the Khyber Pakhtunkhwa Assembly and belongs to the Pakistan Muslim League (N). He is also serving as the chairman or as a member of various committees.

Political career
Khan was elected as the member of the Khyber Pakhtunkhwa Assembly on the ticket of the Pakistan Muslim League (N) from PK-87 (Shangla-I) in the Pakistani general election, 2013.

References

Living people
Pashtun people
Pakistan Muslim League (N) politicians
Khyber Pakhtunkhwa MPAs 2013–2018
People from Shangla District
1980 births